Same Old Tunes is the debut album by Swedish punk rock band Millencolin, released on 28 October 1994 in Sweden by Burning Heart Records under the original title Tiny Tunes.

The song "Da Strike" was released as the album's single, with an accompanying music video.

Controversy
The album's title and cover art mimicked the cartoontelevision show Tiny Toon Adventures, leading to a number of copyright infringement lawsuits against the band when the album was re-released in the United States on 22 September 1998 through Epitaph Records. Warner Bros, the owner of Tiny Toon Adventures, sued the record label and caused the band to change the title and cover art. They chose the title Same Old Tunes to reflect the fact that the album's track list had not changed.

The band also printed T-shirts for the song "Chiquita Chaser" that imitated the logo of Chiquita Brands International, who threatened them with a lawsuit causing them to cease production of the shirts.

Track listing
All songs written by Nikola Sarcevic except where noted.

Personnel

Millencolin
Nikola Sarcevic – lead vocals, bass guitar
Erik Ohlsson – guitar
Mathias Färm – guitar
Fredrik Larzon – drums

Additional musicians
Fredrik Folcke – saxophone on "Da Strike"

References

External links

Same Old Tunes at YouTube (streamed copy where licensed)

Millencolin albums
1994 debut albums
Epitaph Records albums
Burning Heart Records albums